UK Network of Sex Work Projects (UKNSWP) is an umbrella organisation that represents sex work projects in the UK, both agencies or individuals working with sex workers. It facilitates networking between those it represents, so as to share good practice about providing quality support services for sex workers. It is a charity based in Manchester.

In July 2012 UKNSWP launched the National Ugly Mugs (NUM) scheme, a third party reporting system for sex workers that issues alerts to sex workers via their smartphone, and feeds intelligence to police, aiming to reduce offending by dangerous serial sexual offenders.

It was one of five winners of the Guardian Charity Awards 2014.

Mission statement
UKNSWP's website states:
"The UK Network of Sex Work Projects (UKNSWP) is a non-profit, voluntary association of agencies & individuals working with sex workers.

"To promote the health, safety, civil and human rights of sex workers, including their rights to live free from violence, intimidation, coercion or exploitation, to engage in the work as safely as possible, and to receive high quality health and other services in conditions of trust and confidentiality, without discrimination on the grounds of gender, sexual orientation, disability, race, culture or religion."

The UKNSWP recognises and supports, the rights of individual sex workers to self-determination. This includes the right to remain in sex work or leave sex work."

National Ugly Mugs (NUM)
UKNSWP runs National Ugly Mugs (NUM), a third party reporting system for sex workers that issues alerts to sex workers via their smartphone, and feeds intelligence to police, aiming to reduce offending by dangerous serial sexual offenders.

The National Ugly Mugs (NUM) Pilot Scheme was announced by the UK government in December 2011, with £108,000 provided by the Home Office "to establish a national online network to collate and distribute information between 'Ugly Mugs' schemes in local areas." 
Though funded by the Home Office, it is managed independently by UKNSWP. The initial pilot scheme went live in Manchester on 6 July 2012 and by 2016 was undergoing a larger pilot in London.

Award
2014: One of five winners of the Guardian Charity Awards 2014, from The Guardian

See also
Global Network of Sex Work Projects
International Day to End Violence Against Sex Workers
International Union of Sex Workers
Manchester Action on Street Health
Prostitution in the United Kingdom
Sex workers' rights
World Charter for Prostitutes' Rights

References

External links
 

Charities based in Manchester
Sex worker organisations in the United Kingdom